Ithu Thaanda Police is a 2016 Indian Malayalam-language comedy drama film directed by debutant director Manoj Palodan.  It stars Asif Ali in the lead role alongside Abhirami, Janani Iyer, Sajitha Madathil and Sruthi Lakshmi. The story revolves around the life of a lone male police officer as the driver of eleven female officers, inspired by Asia's first women's police station, inaugurated in 1973 in Kozhikode. The film's shoot started on 7 July 2014, in Thodupuzha.

Synopsis
This movie deals with the difficulties faced by Ramakrishnan (Asif Ali), when he is appointed as a driver at Elathur Police Station. There, he has to deal with Arundhathi Varma, a fiery sub-inspector. He realizes that the police officers are behoved to protect a minister and his family. He is also assigned the responsibility to guard the daughter of the minister (Janani Iyer). At the station they have to deal with Xavier (Sunil Sukhada), an industrialist and a wrongdoer, hand in gloves with the police CI Razak (Sudheer Karamana), who were planning to ruin Arundhathi and her team's reputation.

Cast

 Asif Ali as Ramakrishnan
 Janani Iyer as Niya Menon
 Abhirami as Arundhati Varma
 Sajitha Madathil as Lathika
 Sruthi Lakshmi as Mumthas
 Krishna Praba as Annamma
 Neena Kurup as Elsamma
 Sunil Sukhada as Xavier
 Sudheer Karamana as CI Razzak Hussain
 Sneha Sreekumar as Tintu
 Amit Kumar Vashisth as Ramdev/Musafir
Thampi Antony as Mukunthan Menon
Irshad as SP
Sethulakshmi as Lady at bus
Baiju VK as Havildar
Shaju as Chettiyar 
Thodupuzha Vasanthy as Arundathi's Grandmother 
Pradeep Kottayam as Rasheed
Ullas Panthalam as Vakkeel

Production
Asif Ali was signed to play the lead role, police jeep driver Ramakrishnan, with the actor saying that he was living the role since he was the only male actor among an all-woman cast. Ramya Krishnan was supposed to play the role of the sub-inspector Arundhati Varma, but she had to opt out due to date issues and was replaced by Abhirami.

Soundtrack

References

External links

2016 films
2010s Malayalam-language films
Fictional portrayals of the Kerala Police
2016 directorial debut films